Tyler Lee-Deon Davis (born May 22, 1997) is a Puerto Rican professional basketball for the Osos de Manatí of the Baloncesto Superior Nacional (BSN). He played college basketball for the Texas A&M Aggies. He also represents the senior Puerto Rican national basketball team in international national team competitions.

College career
As a freshman, Davis averaged 11.3 points and 6.2 rebounds per game, joining Admon Gilder and D. J. Hogg on a team that reached the Sweet 16. As a sophomore, Davis was a second-team All-SEC player. Between his sophomore and junior season Davis slimmed down to better compete in SEC play. He led the team in scoring as a junior with 14.9 points per game while finishing second in rebounding behind Robert Williams with 8.9 rebounds per game. Following the season he declared for the NBA draft.

Professional career

Oklahoma City Thunder (2018)
After going undrafted in the 2018 NBA draft, Davis joined the Brooklyn Nets for NBA Summer League play. On August 13, 2018, the Oklahoma City Thunder signed Davis to a two-way contract. Davis made his NBA debut on November 28, 2018 against the Cleveland Cavaliers, playing one minute and grabbing a rebound. On December 28, 2018, Davis was waived by the Oklahoma City Thunder. He averaged 17.2 points and 11.5 rebounds per game for the Oklahoma City Blue.

Oklahoma City Blue (2019–2020)
Davis was re-acquired by the Blue in a trade with the Agua Caliente Clippers on November 29, 2019.

Jeonju KCC Egis (2020–2021)
On July 15, 2020, he signed with Jeonju KCC Egis of the Korean Basketball League.

Capitanes de Ciudad de México (2021–2022)
On October 22, 2021, Davis signed with Capitanes de Ciudad de México of the NBA G League. Davis was then later waived by the Capitanes after appearing in 10 games and averaged 11.9 points, 8.5 rebounds, 2.0 assists, and 1.6 blocks per game.

Texas Legends (2022)
On January 11, 2022, Davis cleared waivers and was acquired by the Texas Legends. However, he was waived on February 9 after a season-ending injury.

National team career
Davis represented the Puerto Rican national team at the 2017 FIBA AmeriCup. Davis averaged 12.3 points, 6.7 rebounds and 1.7 assists per game in the tournament.

Career statistics

NBA

Regular season

|-
| align="left" | 
| align="left" | Oklahoma City
| 1 || 0 || .9 || .000 || – || – || 1.0 || .0 || .0 || .0 || .0
|-

NBA G League

|-
| style="text-align:left;"| 2018–19
| style="text-align:left;"| Oklahoma City
| 15 || 8 || 26.7 || .573 || – || .765 || 11.7 || 1.7 || .6 || 1.8 || 17.2
|-

College

|-
| style="text-align:left;"| 2015–16
| style="text-align:left;"| Texas A&M
| 36 || 34 || 22.8 || .655 || – || .625 || 6.2 || .7 || .6 || 1.1 || 11.3
|-
| style="text-align:left;"| 2016–17
| style="text-align:left;"| Texas A&M
| 31 || 31 || 26.2 || .617 || .000 || .693 || 7.0 || 1.4 || .5 || .9 || 14.1
|-
| style="text-align:left;"| 2017–18
| style="text-align:left;"| Texas A&M
| 35 || 35 || 29.1 || .585 || .280 || .623 || 8.9 || 1.3 || .3 || 1.3 || 14.9
|- class="sortbottom"
| style="text-align:center;" colspan="2"| Career
| 102 || 100 || 26.0 || .614 || .269 || .646 || 7.4 || 1.1 || .5 || 1.1 || 13.4

References

External links
Texas A&M Aggies bio

1997 births
Living people
American expatriate basketball people in Mexico
American expatriate basketball people in South Korea
American men's basketball players
American people of Puerto Rican descent
Basketball players from Texas
Basketball players from San Jose, California
Capitanes de Ciudad de México players
Centers (basketball)
Oklahoma City Blue players
Oklahoma City Thunder players
Power forwards (basketball)
Puerto Rican men's basketball players
Sportspeople from Plano, Texas
Texas A&M Aggies men's basketball players
Texas Legends players
Undrafted National Basketball Association players